The University of Michigan has 6,200 faculty members and roughly 38,000 employees which include National Academy members, and Nobel and Pulitzer Prize winners. Several past presidents have gone on to become presidents of Ivy League universities.

Notable faculty: Nobel Laureates
 Joseph Brodsky, Nobel Prize, Literature 1987
 Donald A. Glaser professor of physics, developed in 1954 the world's first liquid bubble chamber to study high-energy subatomic particles and won the Nobel Prize in physics for his invention in 1960
 Charles B. Huggins, Nobel Prize in Physiology or Medicine, 1966	
 Lawrence R. Klein, '30 alumnus; a member of the economics department and the Institute for Social Research. Won the 1980 Nobel Prize in economics for his econometric models forecasting short-term economic trends and policies.
 Gérard Mourou, co-winner of Nobel Prize, Physics, 2018
 Wolfgang Pauli, winner of Nobel Prize, Physics, 1945
 Martin L. Perl, Physics Nobel Prize 1995
 Norman F. Ramsey, Physics Nobel Prize 1989
 Peyton Rous, Nobel Prize in Physiology or Medicine, 1966
 Hamilton O. Smith Nobel Prize, for Physiology or Medicine, 1978
 Charles H. Townes, Nobel Prize for Physics, 1964
 Martinus Veltman, professor emeritus, John D. MacArthur Professor of Physics. 1999 Nobel Prize for Physics.
 Carl Wieman, one of three scientists who shared the 2001 Nobel Prize in Physics joined the U-M faculty immediately following his Ph.D. from Stanford in 1977 and was an assistant professor in the Department of Physics from 1979 to 1984. Now at Colorado.

Notable faculty: past and present
 Madeleine K. Albright, visiting scholar. Albright served as United States Secretary of State from 1997 to 2001 and at the time was the highest-ranking woman in the history of the U.S. government. From 1993 to 1997, Albright was the United States' Permanent Representative to the United Nations and a member of President Clinton's Cabinet and National Security Council.
 W. H. Auden, poet
 Charles Baxter, former director of the MFA program in creative writing; novelist, poet, and essayist; author of 2000 National Book Award finalist The Feast of Love.
 Ruth Behar (born Havana, Cuba, 1956) is a Jewish Cuban American anthropologist, poet, and writer who teaches at the University of Michigan. MacArthur Foundation award winner.
 Seymour Blinder, professor emeritus of chemistry and physics
 R. Stephen Berry (born 1931 in Denver, Colorado) is a U.S. professor of physical chemistry. MacArthur Foundation award winner. He is the James Franck Distinguished Service Professor Emeritus at The University of Chicago and special advisor to the Director for National Security, at Argonne National Laboratory. He joined the Chicago faculty in 1964, having been an assistant professor at Yale University and, between 1957 and 1960, an instructor at the University of Michigan.
 William Bolcom, composer. In 2006 he was awarded four Grammy Awards for his composition "Songs of Innocence and Experience": Best Classical Album, Best Choral Performance, Best Classical Contemporary Composition and Producer of the Year, Classical.
 Kenneth Boulding, noted economist and faculty member 1949–1967
 Richard Brauer Accepted a position at University of Michigan in Ann Arbor in 1948. In 1949 Brauer was awarded the Cole Prize from the American Mathematical Society for his paper "On Artin's L-series with general group characters".
 Henry Billings Brown, instructor in law, later US Supreme Court justice
 Mark Burns, Carlos Mastrangelo, and David Burke invented a DNA analysis "lab on a microchip."
 Evan H. Caminker: Dean of Law School
 Anne Carson (born Toronto, Ontario June 21, 1950) is a Canadian poet, essayist, and translator, as well as a professor of classics and comparative literature at the University of Michigan.MacArthur Foundation award winner.
 Carl Cohen, notable for using Michigan Freedom of Information Act (FOIA) in 1996 to identify U-M's policy of racial categorization in admissions, leading to the Grutter and Gratz v. Bollinger lawsuits.  Professor of Philosophy  specializing in ethics for 50 years as of 2006, civil rights activist, proponent and founder of Michigan Civil Rights Initiative, and author of books on affirmative action and animal rights issues.
Wilbur Joseph Cohen (June 10, 1913, Milwaukee, Wisconsin – May 17, 1987, Seoul, South Korea) was an American social scientist and federal civil servant.  He was one of the key architects in the creation and expansion of the American welfare state and was involved in the creation of both the New Deal and Great Society programs.
 Juan Cole, notable for his weblog "Informed Comment", covering events in the Middle East
 Thomas M. Cooley, law professor, celebrated 19th century legal scholar, and Chief Justice of the Supreme Court of Michigan
 Christopher Chetsanga, (full professor 1979), discovered two enzymes that repair DNA after x-irradiation.  Pro Vice Chancellor 1991–1992 and acting vice chancellor 1992–1993 University of Zimbabwe.
 Arthur Copeland, mathematician
Brian Coppola, professor of chemistry, who was recognized as a 2009 U.S. Professor of the Year by the Carnegie Foundation for the Advancement of Teaching and the Council for Advancement and Support of Education, and as the 2012 recipient of the Robert Foster Cherry Award for Great Teaching, administered by Baylor University.
 Pierre Dansereau, Canadian ecologist known as one of the "fathers of ecology".
 Sheldon Danziger (born September 30, 1948) political scientist, President of the Russell Sage Foundation
Michael Daugherty (born April 28, 1954) is an American composer, pianist, and teacher. Michael Daugherty went home with three awards from the 2011 Grammys. His “Metropolis Symphony,” inspired by the Superman comics, won for best classical contemporary composition, best orchestral performance (along with the composer's “Deus ex Machina,” performed by the Nashville Symphony) and best engineering.
 Michael Duff gained his PhD in theoretical physics in 1972 at Imperial College, London, under Nobel Laureate Abdus Salam. In September 1999 he moved to the University of Michigan, where he is Oskar Klein Professor of Physics. In 2001, he was elected first director of the Michigan Center for Theoretical Physics and was re-elected in 2004. He has since become the principal of the Faculty of Physical Sciences at Imperial College London in Spring 2005.
 Francis Collins led the Human Genome Project and is the current director of the National Institutes of Health.
 John Dewey, co-founder of pragmatism. During his time at Michigan, Dewey twice won the all-campus euchre tournament.
 Igor Dolgachev, mathematician
 Sidney Fine and longest serving faculty member.  Chief biographer of Frank Murphy.
 William Frankena, moral philosopher; Department of Philosophy 1937–78, chair 1947–61; "renowned for his learning in the history of ethics"; "played an especially critical role in defense of fundamental academic freedoms during the McCarthy era."
 Erich Fromm, psychologist
 Robert Frost Michigan Poet-in-Residence.
 Alice Fulton,  United States poet, author, and feminist. She received her undergraduate degree in creative writing in 1976 from Empire State College and her Master of Fine Arts degree from Cornell University in 1982. In 1991, she was awarded a MacArthur Foundation fellowship for her poetry. She taught creative writing at University of Michigan from 1983 to 2001.
 William Gehring, professor of psychology
 Susan Gelman, psychologist
 Herman Heine Goldstine, a mathematician, a winner of the National Medal of Science, worked on the ENIAC, as the Electronic Numerical Integrator and Computer was code named. Taught at the University of Michigan but left when war broke out to become a ballistics officer in the Army.
 Samuel Goudsmit also known as Samuel Abraham Goudsmit. Was a professor at the University of Michigan between 1927 and 1946. Conceived – with George Uhlenback – the idea of Quantum Spin. During WWII he performed research at the MIT Radiation Laboratory, but most importantly served as the chief of the ALSOS group for the Manhattan Project, charged with assessing the German ability to build an atomic bomb. 
 Edward Gramlich, professor of economics and member, Federal Reserve Board
 Linda Gregerson is the Frederick G.L. Huetwell Professor at University of Michigan. Among her collections of poetry are Waterborne" (2002), The Woman Who Died in Her Sleep (1996) and Fire in the Conservatory (1982). She has won many awards and fellowships, among them Guggenheim, Mellon and National Endowment for the Arts fellowships, the Kingsley Tufts Poetry Award and the Isabel MacCaffrey Award.  
 Robert L. Griess is a mathematician working on finite simple groups. He constructed the monster group using the Griess algebra. 
 Kristin Ann Hass
 William Donald "Bill" Hamilton, F.R.S. (August 1, 1936 – March 7, 2000) was a British evolutionary biologist, considered one of the greatest evolutionary theorists of the 20th century. Worked with Robert Axelrod on the Prisoner's Dilemma.
 Donald Hall, English professor and United States Poet Laureate 2006–2007
 Thomas Hales solved a nearly four-century-old problem called the Kepler conjecture. Hales is now at the University of Pittsburgh.
 Paul Halmos, mathematician specializing in functional analysis.
 Eric J. Hill, professor of practice in architecture.
 Melvin Hochster, commutative algebraist. Among his many honors, received the Frank Nelson Cole Prize in Algebra in 1980; received a Guggenheim Fellowship in 1982. In 1992, he was elected to both the American Academy of Sciences and the National Academy of Sciences.
 Andrew Hoffman, an expert in environmental pollution and sustainable enterprise. Professor Hoffman is co-director of the MBA'MS Corporate Environmental Management Program.
 Daniel Hunt Janzen (born 1939 in Milwaukee, Wisconsin, US) is an evolutionary ecologist, naturalist, and conservationist. Before joining the faculty at the University of Pennsylvania he taught at the University of Kansas (1965–1968), the University of Chicago (1969–72) and at the University of Michigan. MacArthur Foundation award winner.
 William Le Baron Jenney(1832—1907) was an American architect and engineer who is known for building the first skyscraper in 1884 and became known as the Father of the American skyscraper.
 Gerome Kamrowski, worked in New York in the 1930s and early 1940s with such artists as William Baziotes, Robert Motherwell and Jackson Pollock, and was at the forefront of the development of American Surrealism and Abstract Expressionism. His work from this period is in the collections of The Metropolitan Museum of Art, MOMA, The Guggenheim Museum, the Whitney Museum of American Art and other major museums worldwide. Faculty, University of Michigan School of Art 1948–82 (Emeritus)
 Gordon Kane, Victor Weisskopf Collegiate Professor of Physics
 H. David Hume, inventor of the human nephron filter ("HNF"), or the artificial kidney.
 Peter J. Khan, associate professor of electrical and computer engineering and as head of the Microwave Solid-State Circuits Group of the Cooley Electronics Laboratory. Now a member of the Universal House of Justice, the nine-person international elected body which coordinates the activities of the Baha'i Faith throughout the world.
Chihiro Kikuchi, professor of nuclear engineering, developed in 1957 the ruby maser, a device for amplifying electrical impulses by stimulated emission of radiation
Barry Klarberg, professional business and wealth manager for athletes, entertainers and high-net-worth individuals
Oskar Klein assumed a post at the University of Michigan, a post he won through the generosity and intervention of his friend Niels Bohr. His first work in Ann Arbor dealt with the anomalous Zeeman effect.
Adrienne Koch, historian, specialist in American history of the 18th century
 Yoram Koren – James J. Duderstadt University Professor of Manufacturing and Paul G. Goebel Professor of Mechanical Engineering in the College of Engineering, inventor of the Reconfigurable Manufacturing System and director of the NSF Engineering Research Center for Reconfigurable Manufacturing Systems 
Kenneth Lieberthal, China expert and member of the National Security Council during the Clinton Administration.
Emmett Leith and Juris Upatnieks (COE: MSE EE 1965) created the first working hologram in 1962
Catharine MacKinnon, feminist legal theorist.
Jason Mars, conversational AI researcher, founder of ClincAI, author.
Paul McCracken, economist. Chairmen emeritus: President's Council of Economic Advisers
Lisa M. Meeks, is an American specialist in disabilities
George E. Mendenhall, professor emeritus: Department of Near Eastern Studies and author.
 Gerald Meyers, professor at the University of Michigan Ross School of Business School, former chairman of American Motors Corporation
 William Ian Miller, legal and social theorist; author of The Anatomy of Disgust.
 Hugh L. Montgomery, Number Theorist. In 1975, with Robert Charles Vaughan, showed that "most" even numbers were expressible as the sum of two primes.
 Thylias Moss developed Limited Fork Poetics, is Professor of English and Art & Design, author of Tokyo Butter (2006), Slave Moth (2004), and is a MacArthur Foundation award winner.
 Professor Gérard A. Mourou, director of the National Science Foundation Center for Ultrafast Optical Science. With students D. Strickland, S. Williamson, P. Maine, and M. Pessot, demonstrated the technique known as Chirped pulse amplification or ("CPA").
 James V. Neel professor of human genetics, in 1940s discovered that defective genes cause sickle cell anemia
Nicholas Negroponte also known as Nicholas P Negroponte. Founder of MIT's Media Lab.
 Reed M. Nesbit, urologist, pioneer of transurethral resection of the prostate
 Dirk Obbink, papyrologist, 2001 MacArthur Fellowship winner for his work at both Oxyrhynchus and Herculaneum. Holds appointments at both Oxford University and the University of Michigan
James Olds neuroscientist, co-discovered the Brain's Pleasure Center.
Will Potter, award-winning author, internationally recognized civil liberties advocate, and TED Senior Fellow.  He is a Distinguished Lecturer and Senior Academic Innovation Fellow at the University of Michigan 
Anatol Rapoport, From 1955 to 1970 Rapoport was Professor of Mathematical Biology and Senior Research Mathematician. He is the author of over 300 articles and of Two-Person Game Theory (1999) and N-Person Game Theory (2001), among many other well-known books on fights, games, violence and peace. His autobiography, Certainties and Doubts: A Philosophy of Life, was released in 2001. A founding member, in 1955, of the Mental Health Research Institute (MHRI) at the University of Michigan.
  Arthur Rich, professor of physics, developed in 1988 with research investigator James C. Van House first positron microscope
 Gottlieb Eliel Saarinen, Architect
 Jonas Salk, assistant professor of epidemiology (deceased)
 Vojislav Šešelj, Serbian political scientist and nationalist leader. 
 Anton Shammas, professor of comparative literature and modern Middle Eastern literature; Poet, playwright, essayist, and translator of Arab-Christian descent; acclaimed author of the novel Arabesques.
 Marilyn Shatz, Professor Emerita of Psychology and Linguistics
 Lawrence Sklar, William K. Frankena Collegiate Professor and Professor of Philosophy, Guggenheim fellow 1974. 
 * Elliot Soloway, software teaching tools, founder of GoKnow
 Kannan Soundararajan was awarded the 2004 Salem Prize, joint winner of the 2005 SASTRA Ramanujan Prize
 Theodore J. St. Antoine, law school dean and labor arbitrator
 Stephen Timoshenko created the first US bachelor's and doctoral programs in engineering mechanics. His 18 textbooks have been published in 36 languages.
 Amos Tversky Deceased. Behavioral economist and frequent co-author with Daniel Kahneman 2002 Nobel Prize
 A. Galip Ulsoy – C.D. Mote, Jr. Distinguished University Professor and William Clay Ford Professor of Manufacturing in the College of Engineering, co-inventor of the Reconfigurable Manufacturing System, and deputy director of the NSF Engineering Research Center for Reconfigurable Manufacturing Systems
 Douglas E. Van Houweling, president and CEO of Internet2
Raymond Louis Wilder, began teaching at the University of Michigan in 1926, where he remained until his retirement in 1967. Wilder's work focused on set-theoretic topology, manifolds and use of algebraic techniques. 
 Milford H. Wolpoff, professor of anthropology and adjunct associate research scientist, UM Museum of Anthropology; recognized globally as the leading proponent of the multiregional hypothesis for human evolution.
 Trevor D. Wooley Department Chair, Department of Mathematics, University of Michigan. Salem Prize, 1998. Alfred P. Sloan Research Fellow, 1993–1995.

American Association for the Advancement of Science 

Fellows of the American Association for the Advancement of Science. Founded in 1848, AAAS is the world's largest general scientific society and publisher of the journal Science. The tradition of AAAS Fellows began in 1874.

 Sharon Glotzer, (2013). Ph.D., is an American chemical engineer and physicist and the Stuart W. Churchill Professor at the University of Michigan.
 Huda Akil, (2000). Ph.D., Gardner C. Quarton Professor of Neurosciences in psychiatry, professor of psychiatry and co-director and senior research scientist of the U-M Mental Health Research Institute.
 Bernard W. Agranoff, (1998). Director of the Neuroscience Lab, the Ralph Waldo Gerard Professor of Neurosciences, professor of biological chemistry and research scientist in the Department of Psychiatry and the Mental Health Research Institute.
 Sushil Atreya, Ph.D., (2005). Professor of atmospheric and space sciences. Atreya is honored for contributions to planetary atmosphere structure.
 Laurence A. Boxer, (1998). Associate chair for research pediatrics and communicable diseases and professor of pediatrics and communicable diseases.
 George J. Brewer, (2000) M.D., professor of genetics and internal medicine.
 Charles M. Butter, (1992). Professor of psychology
 Valerie Castle, M.D., (2005). Chair and Ravitz Foundation Professor of Pediatrics and Communicable Diseases.
 Brian Coppola, Ph.D., (2001). Arthur F. Thurnau Professor of Chemistry.
 Dimitri Coucouvanis, Ph.D., (2005). Lawrence S. Bartell Collegiate Professor of Chemistry.
 James Coward, (2004) Professor of Medicinal Chemistry and Professor of Chemistry
 Jack E. Dixon, (2000). Ph.D., Minor J. Coon Professor of Biological Chemistry, chair of the Department of Biological Chemistry and new co-director of UM"s Life Sciences Institute.
 Rodney Ewing, (2004). Donald R. Peacor Collegiate Professor of Geological Sciences, professor of materials science and engineering, and professor of nuclear engineering and radiological sciences
 William R. Farrand, (1992). Professor of geological sciences and curator, Museum of Anthropology.
 Carol A. Fierke, Ph.D., (2006). Jerome and Isabella Karle collegiate Professor of Chemistry.  Chair and Professor of Chemistry.
 Daniel Fisher, (2004). Claude W. Hibbard Collegiate Professor of Paleontology, professor of geological sciences, professor of ecology and evolutionary biology, and curator of paleontology
 Vincent L. Pecoraro, (2000). John T. Groves Collegiate Professor of Chemistry
 James Penner-Hann, (2004). Professor of chemistry
 H. David Humes, (1998). Chair of the Department of Internal Medicine and the John G. Searle Professor of Internal Medicine.
 James S. Jackson, Ph.D., (2005). Daniel Katz Distinguished University Professor of Psychology and director, Institute for Social Research.
 Harold K. Jacobson, (2000). Jesse Siddal Reeves Professor of Political Science, and senior research scientist, Center for Political Studies.
 George W. Kling, (1998). Assistant professor of biology and assistant research scientist in the Center for Great Lakes and Aquatic Sciences.
 Arthur Lupia, (2004). Professor of political science, research professor at the Institute for Social Research, and principal investigator of the American National Election Studies.
 Anne McNeil, (2017)  Arthur F. Thurnau Professor of Chemistry and Macromolecular Science and Engineering
 Miriam H. Meisler, (2001). Professor of human genetics and neurology, Myron Levine Distinguished University Professor of Human Genetics.
 Henry Mosberg, (2004). Professor of medicinal chemistry
 Franco Nori, (2007). Elected AAAS Fellow for his contributions to condensed matter physics, nanoscience, quantum optics, and quantum information.
 Melanie Sanford, (2016)  Moses Gomberg Collegiate Professor of Chemistry and Arthur F. Thurnau Professor of Chemistry
 Kamal Sarabandi, (2016) Rufus S. Teesdale Professor of Engineering, director of Radiation Laboratory, Department of Electrical Entering and Computer Science. 
Artur Schnabel Pianist and classical composer
 Martin Sichel, (1998). Professor of aerospace engineering.
 Nicholas H. Steneck, (1992). Professor of history and director, Medical Center Historical Center for the Health Sciences.
 Sarah Thomason, (2010). William H. Gedney Professor of Linguistics
George Uhlenbeck also known as George Eugene Uhlenbeck. With fellow student Samuel Goudsmit at Leiden, Uhlenbeck proposed the idea of electron spin in 1925, fulfilling Wolfgang Pauli's stated need for a "fourth quantum number.” Served as Professor: University of Michigan (1939–43). Max Planck Medal 1964 (with Samuel Goudsmit). 
 Stanley J. Watson, (2000). Ph.D., M.D., Raphael Professor of Neurosciences in Psychiatry and co-director and research scientist at MHRI.
 Max S. Wicha, (2000). M.D., professor of internal medicine and director of the U-M Comprehensive Cancer Center.
 Milford Wolpoff, who has been elected to the rank of Fellow in the American Association for the Advancement of Science. 
 Youxue Zhang, Ph.D., (2005). Professor of geological sciences. Zhang was selected for making exceptional advances in a wide range of geological frontiers, including the origin and evolution of the Earth, explosive volcanism and gas-driven lake eruptions.

Business Week "Management Gurus" 

 Gary Hamel, MBA PhD Co-Author "The Core Competence of the Corporation"
 Dave Ulrich, Human Resources – Michigan (Ranked #1)
 Noel Tichy, Leadership – Michigan, (Ranked #9)
 C.K. Prahalad, C.K. Prahalad, Strategy, International Business – Michigan/ PRAJA, (Ranked #10)

Institute of Medicine 

 Bernard W. Agranoff (1991), professor of biological chemistry; professor of psychiatry, Medical School
 Huda Akil (1994), Gardner C. Quarton Distinguished Professor of Neurosciences in Psychiatry, Medical School
 William Barsan (2003), professor, Department of Emergency Medicine, Medical School
 John D. Birkmeyer, M.D., George D. Zuidema Professor of Surgery, division of gastrointestinal surgery, department of surgery, University of Michigan, Ann Arbor
 Michael Boehnke, Ph.D., Richard G. Cornell Collegiate Professor of Biostatistics, department of biostatistics, School of Public Health, University of Michigan, Ann Arbor
 Edward Bove (1985), head, Section of Cardiac Surgery, Medical School
 Noreen M Clark (2000), dean, Marshall H. Becker Professor of Public Health, School of Public Health
 Mary Sue Coleman (1997), president, professor of biochemistry, Medical School, & chemistry, College of Literature, Science, & the Arts
 Francis S. Collins (1991), professor of internal medicine; professor of human genetics, Medical School
 Jerome Conn (1970), Louis Harry Newburgh university Distinguished Professor Emeritus of Internal Medicine, Medical School
 Minor J. Coon (1987), Victor C. Vaughn Distinguished University Professor of Biological Chemistry, Medical School
 Jack Dixon (1993), Minor J. Coon Professor of Biological Chemistry, Medical School
 Avedis Donabedian (1971), Sinai Distinguished Professor Emeritus of Public Health, School of Public Health
 Rhetaugh Dumas (1984), Dean Emerita, School of Nursing
 Stefan Fajans (1985), professor emeritus of internal medicine, Medical School
 Christopher R. Friese (2020), Elizabeth Tone Hosmer Professor of Nursing, School of Nursing, & health management and policy, School of Public Health
 Sid Gilman (1995), William J. Herdman Professor of Neurology, Medical School
 David Ginsburg (1999), professor of internal medicine & human genetics, Medical School
 Lazar Greenfield (1995), Frederick A. Coller Distinguished Professor, Surgery, Medical School
 Ada Sue Hinshaw (1989), dean, School of Nursing 
 Julian Hoff (1999), professor of surgery, Medical School
 James S. House (1999), professor of sociology, College of Literature, Science, & the Arts
 James Jackson (2002), professor of psychology, College of Literature, Science, & the Arts
 Robert L. Kahn (2002), professor emeritus of psychology, College of Literature, Science, & the Arts
 George Kaplan (2001), professor of epidemiology, School of Public Health
 David E. Kuhl (1989), professor of internal medicine; professor of radiology, Medical School
 Allen S. Lichter (2001), dean, professor of radiation oncology, Medical School
 Roderick Little (2011), professor of biostatistics, School of Public Health
Martha L. Ludwig, Ph.D., research biophysicist and J. Lawrence Oncley Distinguished Professor, department of biological chemistry, University of Michigan, Ann Arbor
 Howard Markel (1993), George E. Wantz Distinguished Professor of the History of Medicine and director of the Center for the History of Medicine
 Rowena Matthews elected to The Institute of Medicine of the National Academy of Sciences.
Catherine G. McLaughlin, Ph.D., professor, department of health management and policy, and director, Economic Research Institute on the Uninsured, University of Michigan School of Public Health, Ann Arbor
 James V. Neel (1972), Lee R. Dice distinguished university professor emeritus of Human genetics, Medical School
 Gilbert S. Omenn (1979), professor of internal medicine & Human genetics, Medical School, and of public health, School of Public Health 
Nancy Reame (1996), professor of nursing, School of Nursing
 June Osborn (1986), professor of epidemiology; professor of pediatrics and communicable diseases, Medical School
 Alan R. Saltiel, elected in 2005 to The Institute of Medicine of the National Academy of Sciences. Saltiel is the John Jacob Abel Collegiate Professor in Life Sciences and Professor of Internal Medicine and Physiology. He is the third LSI faculty member to be named to the Institute of Medicine.
 Thomas L. Schwenk (2002), professor of family medicine, Medical School
 Harold Shapiro (1989), former UM president
 Peter Ward (1990), Godfrey D. Stobbe Professor of Pathology, Medical School
 Kenneth Warner (1996), Richard D. Remington Collegiate Professor of Public Health; professor of health management & policy, School of Public Health
 Stanley J. Watson (1994), Theophile Raphael Collegiate Professor of Neurosciences, Medical School
 Stephen J. Weiss (2001), Upjohn Professor of Internal Medicine and Oncology, Medical School
 David R. Williams (2001), Harold W. Cruse Collegiate Professor of Sociology, College of Literature, Science, & the Arts, and professor of epidemiology, School of Public Health
 George Zuldema (1971), vice provost for medical affairs emeritus, and professor emeritus of surgery, Medical School

MacArthur Foundation award winners 

, 41 MacArthur winners — 16 of them university alumni — have served as Michigan faculty
Elizabeth S. Anderson (born 5 December 1959) is an American philosopher.
 William A. Christian, (Alumnus: 1986), religious studies scholar.
 Philip DeVries, (Alumnus: 1988), 1962 alumnus who won as a biologist.
 William H. Durham, (Alumnus: 1983), 1973 graduate, anthropologist.
 Aaron Dworkin, (Alumnus: 2005) M.A. 1998, Fellow and founder and president of Detroit-based Sphinx Organization, which strives to increase the number of African-Americans and Latinos having careers in classical music.
 Steven Goodman, (Alumnus: 2005) A.B.D., Fellow is an adjunct research investigator in the U-M Museum of Zoology's bird division, and a conservation biologist in the Department of Zoology at Chicago's Field Museum of Natural History.
 David Green, (Alumnus: 2004), alumnus, executive director, Project Impact.
 Ann Ellis Hanson, (Alumna: 1992), visiting associate professor of Greek and Latin.
 John Henry Holland,(Alumnus: 1992), professor of electrical engineering and computer science, College of Engineering; professor of psychology, College of Literature, Science, and the Arts.
 Vonnie C. McLoyd, (Alumna: M.A. (1973) and Ph.D. (1975)), professor of psychology and research scientist at the Center for Human Growth and Development
Natalia Molina (Professor and Alumna) Molina received her Ph.D. and M.A. from the University of Michigan.
 Cecilia Muñoz, (Alumna: 2000), vice president of the National Council of La Raza.
 Amos Tversky, (Alumnus: 1984), 1965 alumnus, psychologist.
 Karen K. Uhlenbeck, (Alumna: 1983), 1964, mathematician.
 Henry T. Wright, (Alumnus: 1993) Fellow, and Anthropologist.
 George Zweig, (Alumnus: 1981), 1959 alumnus, physicist.

, 25 non-alumni MacArthur winners have served as Michigan faculty.

 Susan Alcock, (Faculty: 2000), professor of classical anthropology and classics, College of Literature, Science, and the Arts.
 Robert Axelrod, (Faculty: 1987) Fellow for public policy. Dr. Axelrod is a game theoretician. Author of "The Evolution of Cooperation".
 Ruth Behar, (Faculty: 1988) Fellow, and Anthropologist.
 R. Stephen Berry (post-doctoral fellow) is a U.S. professor of physical chemistry.
 Joseph Brodsky, (Faculty: 1981), professor of Slavic languages and literature.
Jason De León is an associate professor in the Department of Anthropology who studies violence, materiality and the social process of migration between Latin America and the United States. 
Alice Fulton, (Faculty: 1991) Fellow and Professor of English from 1983 to 2001, won the Library of Congress Rebekah Johnson Bobbitt National Prize for Poetry in 2002.
 Kun-Liang Guan, (Faculty: 1998) Fellow and biochemist and associate professor of biological chemistry and senior research associate at the Institute of Gerontology.
 Thomas C. Holt, (Faculty: 1990) professor of history, director of Center for Afroamerican and African Studies.
 Stephen Lee, (Faculty: 1993) Fellow, solid state chemistry.
 Michael Marletta, (Faculty: 1995) Fellow, biochemist and John Gideon Searle Professor of Medicinal Chemistry and Pharmacognosy in the College of Pharmacy and professor of biological chemistry in the Medical School.
Khaled Mattawa (born 1964) (Faculty: 2014) is a Libyan poet, and a renowned Arab-American writer and designated a fellow in 2014
 Tiya Miles, (Faculty: 2011) professor of American culture, Afroamerican & African studies, history, and Native American studies
 Thylias Moss, (Faculty: 1996), Fellow and Professor of English, also Professor of Art & Design (2006).
 Erik Mueggler, (Faculty: 2002), Katherine Verdery Collegiate Professor of Anthropology, College of Literature, Science, and the Arts.
Margaret Murnane (born 1959) is Distinguished Professor of Physics at the University of Colorado at Boulder, having moved there in 1999, with past positions at the University of Michigan (1996-1999) and Washington State University. 
Dirk Obbink (faculty) is an American-born papyrologist and Classicist.
 Sherry B. Ortner, (Faculty: 1990), professor of anthropology and women's studies
Derek Peterson, a professor in the departments of History and Afroamerican and African Studies, has done scholarly work about the intellectual and cultural history of eastern Africa. 
 Melanie Sanford, (Faculty: 2011), Moses Gomberg Collegiate professor of chemistry
 Rebecca J. Scott, (Faculty: 1990) Fellow and Professor of History.won the 2006 Frederick Douglass Book Prize for Degrees of Freedom: Louisiana and Cuba After Slavery. The $25,000 prize is awarded by the Gilder Lehrman Center for the Study of Slavery, Resistance, and Abolition at Yale University.
 Bright Sheng (Faculty: 2001), professor of composition and music theory, School of Music.
 Richard Wrangham, (Faculty: 1987) professor of anthropology.
 Yukiko Yamashita, (Faculty: 2011) assistant professor of cell & developmental biology

United States National Academy of Engineering 

 Linda M. Abriola (2003), professor of civil and environmental engineering, College of Engineering
 Ellen Arruda (2017), professor and chair of mechanical engineering, College of Engineering
 Dennis Assanis (2008), former Jon R. and Beverly S. Holt Professor of Mechanical Engineering and Arthur F. Thurnau Professor, College of Engineering
 Peter Banks (1993), dean, College of Engineering
 Pallab Bhattacharya (2008), Charles M. Vest Distinguished University Professor and James R. Mellor Professor of Electrical engineering and Computer Science, College of Engineering
 William Brown (1992), adjunct professor of electrical engineering, College of Engineering
 Don B. Chaffin (1994), G. Lawton and Louise G. Johnson Professor of Industrial & Operations Engineering, College of Engineering
 Lynn Conway (1989), professor of electrical engineering and computer science, College of Engineering
 James W. Daily (1975), professor emeritus of fluid mechanics and hydraulic engineering, College of Engineering
 Stephen W. Director (1989), Robert J. Vlasic Dean of Engineering, College of Engineering
 James J. Duderstadt (1987), president emeritus, professor of nuclear engineering and radiological sciences, College of Engineering
 Gerard Faeth (1991), Arthur B. Modine Professor of Aerospace Engineering, College of Engineering
 Elmer G. Gilbert (1994), professor of aerospace engineering and of electrical engineering & computer science, College of Engineering
 Steven A. Goldstein (2005), Henry Ruppenthal Family Professor of Orthopaedic Surgery and Bioengineering
 George Haddad (1994), Robert J. Hiller professor of electrical engineering and computer science, College of Engineering
 Robert D. Hanson (1982), professor of civil engineering, College of Engineering
 Bruce G. Johnston (1979), professor emeritus of structural engineering, College of Engineering
 Donald Katz (1968), professor emeritus of chemical engineering, college
 Glenn Knoll (1999), professor of nuclear engineering and radiological sciences, College of Engineering
 Yoram Koren (2004), James J. Duderstadt Distinguished University Professor and Paul G. Goebel Professor of Mechanical Engineering, College of Engineering
 Ronald G. Larson (2003), George Granger Brown Professor of Chemical Engineering, College of Engineering
 Emmett Leith (1982), Schlumberger Professor of Engineering, College of Engineering
 Jyoti Mazumder (2012), Robert H. Lurie Professor of Mechanical Engineering and Professor of Materials Science and Engineering, College of Engineering
 Gerard A. Mourou (2002), A.D. Moore Distinguished Professor of Electrical Engineering & and Computer Science, College of Engineering
 Stephen M. Pollock (2002), Herrick Professor of Industrial & Operations Engineering, College of Engineering
 Tresa M. Pollock (2005), the L. H. and F. E. Van Vlack Professor of Materials Science and Engineering
 Frank E. Richart, Jr. (1969), Walter Johnson Emmons Professor Emeritus of Civil Engineering, College of Engineering
 Albert Schultz (1993), Vennema Professor of Mechanical Engineering & Applied Mathematics, College of Engineering
 Chen-To Tai (1987), professor emeritus of electrical engineering & computer science, College of Engineering
 Fawwaz Ulaby (1995), R. Jamison and Betty Williams Professor of Electrical Engineering & Computer Science, College of Engineering
 Galip Ulsoy (2006), C.D. Mote Jr. Distinguished University Professor of Mechanical Engineering and William Clay Ford Professor of Manufacturing, College of Engineering
 Walter Weber (1985), Earnest Boyce professor of Civil & Environmental engineering, College of Engineering
 Kensall D. Wise (1998), J. Reid & Polly Anderson Professor of Manufacturing Technology, College of Engineering
 Richard D. Woods (2003), professor of civil & environmental engineering, College of Engineering
 Ralph T. Yang (2005), Dwight T. Benton Professor of Chemical Engineering
 Chia-Shun Yih (1980), Stephen P. Timoshenko Distinguished University Professor Emeritus of Fluid Mechanics, College of Engineering

United States National Academy of Sciences 

 Mathew Alpern (1991), professor emeritus of physiological optics, Medical School
 Richard D. Alexander (1974), Theodore H. Hubell Distinguished University Professor Emeritus of Evolutionary Biology, College of Literature, Science & the Arts
 Robert Axelrod (1986), Arthur W. Bromage Distinguished University Professor of Political Science & Public Policy, School of Public Policy
 Hyman Bass (1982), professor of education, School of Education, & mathematics, College of Literature, Science & the Arts
Philip Bucksbaum 2004
 Jerome Conn (1969), Louis Harry Newburgh University Professor Emeritus of Internal Medicine, Medical School
 Philip Converse (1973), Robert Cooley Angell Distinguished University Professor Emeritus of Sociology & Political Science, College of Literature, Science & the Arts
 Clyde Coombs (1982), professor emeritus of psychology, College of Literature, Science & the Arts
 Minor J. Coon (1983), Victor C. Vaughn Distinguished University Professor Emeritus of Biological Chemistry, Medical School
 H. Richard Crane (1966), George P. Williams Distinguished University, physicist
 Horace W. Davenport (1974), William Beaumont Professor Emeritus of Physiology, Medical School
 Thomas M. Donahue (1983), Edward H. White II Distinguished University Professor Emeritus of Planetary Science, College of Engineering
 Lennard A. Fisk (2003), Thomas M. Donahue Collegiate Professor of Space Science, College of Engineering
 Kent V. Flannery (1978), James B. Griffin Distinguished University Professor of Anthropological Archaeology, College of Literature Science & the Arts
 Ronald Freedman (1974), Roderick D. McKenzie Professor Emeritus of Sociology, College of Literature, Science & the Arts, professor emeritus of physics, College of Literature, Science, & the Arts
 Katherine Freese (2020), George E. Uhlenbeck Professor Emerita of Physics
 William Fulton (1997), M. S. Keeler Professor, mathematics, College of Literature, Science & the Arts
 Stanley M. Garn (1976), professor emeritus of nutrition, School of Public Health
 Frederick Gehring (1989), T.H. Hildebrandt Distinguished University Professor of Mathematics
 Sharon Glotzer, (2014), Stuart W. Churchill Professor of Chemical Engineering. Professor of Materials Science & Engineering, Physics, Applied Physics and Macromolecular Science and Engineering.
 Melvin Hochster (1992), Raymond L. Wilder Professor of Mathematics, College of Literature, Science & the Arts
Raymond Kelly 2004
 Martha L. Ludwig (2003), professor of biological chemistry, Medical School
 Joyce Marcus (1997), professor of anthropology, College of Literature, Science & the Arts
 Vincent Massey (1995), professor of biological chemistry, Medical School
 Rowena G. Matthews (2002), G. Robert Greenberg Distinguished University Professor, biological chemistry, Medical School
 James N. Morgan (1975), professor emeritus of economics, College of Literature, Science & the Arts
 James V. Neel (1963), Lee R. Dice Distinguished University Professor Emeritus of Human Genetics, Medical School
 Richard Nisbett (2002), Theodore M. Newcomb Distinguished University Professor, psychology, College of Literature, Science, & the Arts
 James Olds (1969), professor of psychology
J. Lawrence Oncley (1947), professor emeritus of biological chemistry, Medical School
 Kenneth Pike (1985), professor emeritus of linguistics, College of Literature, Science & the Arts
 Melanie Sanford (2016)  Moses Gomberg Collegiate Professor of Chemistry and Arthur F. Thurnau Professor of Chemistry
 Edward Smith (1996), professor of psychology, College of Literature, Science & the Arts
 Martinus Veltman (2000), John D. MacArthur Professor of Physics, College of Literature, Science, & the Arts
 Warren Wagner (1985), Jr., professor emeritus of botany, School of Natural Resources & the Environment
 Henry Wright (1994), professor of anthropology, College of Literature, Science & the Arts; curator, Museum of Anthropology
 Robert D. Drennan (1975), professor of anthropology, school of arts and sciences

National Medal of Science 
The National Medal of Science is the nation's highest honor for scientific achievement. Five other Michigan researchers won the award between 1974 and 1986. Congress established the award program in 1959. It honors individuals for pioneering scientific research.

Hyman Bass honored by President Bush  in a White House ceremony for the National Medal of Science in 2006. 
 H. Richard Crane (1986), George P. Williams Distinguished University Professor Emeritus of Physics, College of Literature, Science & the Arts
 Elizabeth Crosby (1979), professor of anatomy, Medical School
 Donald Katz (1982), professor emeritus of chemical engineering, College of Engineering
 Emmett Leith (1979), Schlumberger Professor of Engineering, College of Engineering
 James Neel (1974), Lee R. Dice Distinguished University Professor Emeritus of Human Genetics, Medical School

Pulitzer Prize-winning faculty 

 Leslie Bassett (1966), professor of music; music, for Variations for Orchestra.
 William Bolcom (1988), professor of music composition; music, for Twelve New Etudes for Piano.
 Ross Lee Finney (1937), professor of music; music, for a string quartet.
 Robert Frost, a former faculty member won four Pulitzer Prizes through the years.
 Percival Price (1934), carillonneur and professor of campanology; music, for Saint Lawrence Symphony.
 Leland Stowe (1930), professor of journalism; correspondence, for his work as a reporter on the foreign staff of the New York Herald Tribune.
 David C. Turnley (1990), professor of art and design; photography, for images of the political uprisings in China and Eastern Europe.
 Claude H. Van Tyne (1930), professor and chairman of the history department; American History, for The War of Independence.
 Heather Ann Thompson (2017), professor of American history; for her book on the Attica Prison uprising of 1971.

University of Michigan-Ann Arbor faculty 

 Alton L Becker, PhD, professor of linguistics
 Judith Becker, PhD, Glenn McGeoch Professor (emeritus) of Music
 Cécile Fromont, assistant professor of art history
 Lois Wladis Hoffman, PhD, professor emerita, Department of Psychology.
 Lawrence W. Jones, PhD, professor emeritus, Department of Physics
 Ralph Lydic, PhD, Bert La Du Professor, Department of Anesthesiology and Molecular and Integrative Physiology.
 William P. Malm, PhD, professor (emeritus) of music
Ronni Reis, tennis coach
 Leopoldo Pando Zayas, PhD, professor of physics, specializing in string theory
 Elizabeth Yakel, PhD, professor and senior associate dean for academic affairs at the iSchool, specializing in digital archives and digital preservation
 Weiping Zou, MD, PhD, Charles B de Nancrede Professor of Surgery, Immunology and Biology; director for translational research

Former administrators 

 Erastus Otis Haven (1820–1881), president (1863–69), later Bishop of the Methodist Episcopal Church
 Lee Bollinger, president, now president of Columbia University
 Nancy Cantor, provost, now chancellor of Syracuse University
 Paul Danos, UM associate dean, now dean at Dartmouth College's Tuck School of Business
 Steven Director UM engineering dean, now provost of Northeastern University
 Walter Harrison, vice president, now at University of Hartford
 Maureen Hartford, vice president, later president of Meredith College 
 Harlan Hatcher (1898–1998), president (1951–1967)
 C. C. Little, president (1925–1929), noted cancer researcher and tobacco industry scientist.
 J. Bernard "Bernie" Machen, provost, later president of the University of Florida
 Frank H. T. Rhodes, vice president, later president of Cornell University
 Harold Shapiro, president; later president of Princeton University
 Edward A. Snyder, senior associate dean, later dean at University of Chicago Business School
 Andrew Dickson White, UM professor of literature, co-founder of Cornell University
 B. Joseph White, dean, Ross School, later president of the University of Illinois
 Linda Wilson, UM vice president, later president of Radcliffe College

References

External links
 Faculty and staff at the University of Michigan
 UM Faculty and staff resources
 UM Faculty and staff services
 The Michigan Daily Salary Supplement lists the salaries of UM faculty and staff

University of Michigan faculty and staff